

Atlantic coastline of the American continent

Cities are listed along the Atlantic coastline of the American continent north to south, from Canada to Chile.

Americas, coastal
 Americas
Coastal settlements